Yamasa Corporation (ヤマサ醤油株式会社 Yamasa Shōyu Kabushikigaisha) is a Japanese corporation founded in 1645 whose primary field of business is the manufacturing of soy sauce and various seasonings. It was incorporated in November 1928. With its head office located in Choshi, Chiba, it runs two factories in Chiba (located in Choshi and Narita), and a third located in Salem, Oregon, United States., where subsidiary Yamasa Corporation USA is headed.

The corporate logo, a ∧ with a サ under it, is a notable example of a Japanese rebus monogram.

References

External links
YAMASA Corporation
Yamasa Corporation USA

Food and drink companies of Japan
Companies based in Chiba Prefecture
Companies established in 1645
Companies based in Salem, Oregon
1645 establishments in Japan
Japanese brands
Chōshi